Richard Onslow, 3rd Baron Onslow KB  (1713 – 8 October 1776) was a British peer and politician, styled Hon. Richard Onslow from 1717 to 1740.

He was the son of Thomas Onslow, 2nd Baron Onslow of Clandon Park, Surrey and educated at Eton College (1725-8) and Sidney Sussex College, Cambridge.

In 1734, Onslow was returned as Member of Parliament for Guildford, holding that position until 1740.  In that year, he succeeded his father Thomas as Lord Onslow, and also succeeded him in his offices of High Steward of (the borough of) Guildford and Lord Lieutenant of Surrey.

The family seat remains Clandon Park, East and West Clandon, Surrey; however, Clandon Park House is now a National Trust mansion with its gardens, which was for the most part commissioned by his father. On 16 May 1741, he married Mary Elwill (d. 19 April 1812), daughter of Sir Edmund Elwill, 3rd Baronet at her mother's residence in Clifford Street in Mayfair; the marriage was childless. Lord Onslow received an LL.D. from the University of Cambridge in 1749 and was made a Knight Companion of the Order of the Bath in 1752. Upon his death in 1776, he was succeeded by special remainder in the barony by his second cousin, George Onslow.

References

1713 births
1776 deaths
People educated at Eton College
Alumni of Sidney Sussex College, Cambridge
Members of the Parliament of Great Britain for English constituencies
British MPs 1734–1741
3
Knights Companion of the Order of the Bath
Lord-Lieutenants of Surrey
Surrey Militia officers
Richard Onslow, 3rd Baron